Mont Outheran (1,676 m) is a mountain of the Chartreuse Mountains in the French Prealps, Savoie, France.

Geography
The Mont Outheran is a narrow plateau, lying several kilometers in the north-south direction between the Col du Grapillon at the south and the Col du Planet at the north. It is surrounded by cliffs on all sides. The west cliff defines the territory of the commune of Saint-Thibaud-de-Couz. Much of Mont Outheran is wholly owned by the township.

The Mont Outheran consists of urgonian limestone.

Mountains of Savoie
Mountains of the Alps
Chartreuse Mountains